Staffordshire was a county constituency of the House of Commons of the Parliament of England then of the Parliament of Great Britain from 1707 to 1800 and of the Parliament of the United Kingdom from 1801 to 1832. It was represented by two Members of Parliament until 1832.

History

Boundaries and franchise
The constituency, which first returned members to Parliament in 1290, consisted of the historic county of Staffordshire, excluding the city of Lichfield which had the status of a county in itself after 1556. (Although Staffordshire also contained the boroughs of Stafford and Newcastle-under-Lyme, and part of the borough of Tamworth, each of which elected two MPs in its own right for part of the period when Staffordshire was a constituency, these were not excluded from the county constituency, and owning property within the borough could confer a vote at the county election. This was not the case, though, for Lichfield.)

As in other county constituencies the franchise between 1430 and 1832 was defined by the Forty Shilling Freeholder Act, which gave the right to vote to every man who possessed freehold property within the county valued at £2 or more per year for the purposes of land tax; it was not necessary for the freeholder to occupy his land, nor even in later years to be resident in the county at all.

Except briefly during the period of the Commonwealth, Staffordshire had two MPs, traditionally known as Knights of the Shire, elected by the bloc vote method, under which each voter had two votes. (In the First and Second Parliaments of Oliver Cromwell's Protectorate, there was a general redistribution of seats and Staffordshire elected three members; the traditional arrangements were restored from 1659.)

Character
In the Middle Ages Staffordshire was mainly an agricultural county, but was transformed by the Industrial Revolution and had become significantly urbanised. By the time of the Great Reform Act in 1832, Staffordshire had a population of approximately 410,000, of which around 65,000 were in Wolverhampton, 60,000 in the urban area round Stoke-on-Trent, and 15,000 in Walsall. Its principal industries were hardware and pottery manufacture, and it also drew prosperity from the importance of the River Trent as a means of transport and from the extensive canal network constructed in the county in the 18th century.

Nevertheless, the urban and industrial interests had no opportunity to develop political leverage in Staffordshire. Although the qualified electorate numbered some 5,000 in the 18th century, control of the representation was entirely in the hands of a small number of aristocratic families, most notably the  Leveson-Gowers (Marquesses of Stafford) and the Bagots. As in most counties of any size, contested elections were avoided whenever possible because of the expense. Elections were held at a single polling place, Stafford, and voters from the rest of the county had to travel to the county town to exercise their franchise; candidates were expected to meet the expenses of their supporters in travelling to the poll and to entertain them lavishly with food and drink when they got there. The MPs were generally chosen by and from among the principal families of the county, and it would have been futile as well as ruinously expensive for an outsider to fight an election. In fact there were only three contested elections in Staffordshire between 1700 and 1747, and none at all afterwards: in 1753, the Leveson Gowers and the Bagots, despite their political differences (the former being Whigs and the latter Tories) reached a satisfactory compromise, and thereafter the Leveson Gowers nominated one MP and the remaining county gentry the other (who was frequently a Bagot).

Abolition
The constituency was abolished in 1832 by the Great Reform Act, which divided the county into two new two-member divisions, Northern Staffordshire and Southern Staffordshire, and also created new boroughs from three of the larger towns previously in the county constituency (Stoke-upon-Trent, Walsall and Wolverhampton).

Members of Parliament

MPs 1290–1640

MPs 1640–1832

Elections

See also
List of former United Kingdom Parliament constituencies
Unreformed House of Commons

References
Robert Beatson, A Chronological Register of Both Houses of Parliament (London: Longman, Hurst, Res & Orme, 1807) 
D Brunton & D H Pennington, Members of the Long Parliament (London: George Allen & Unwin, 1954)
 John Cannon, Parliamentary Reform 1640-1832 (Cambridge: Cambridge University Press, 1972)
Cobbett's Parliamentary history of England, from the Norman Conquest in 1066 to the year 1803 (London: Thomas Hansard, 1808) 
 Maija Jansson (ed.), Proceedings in Parliament, 1614 (House of Commons) (Philadelphia: American Philosophical Society, 1988) 
 Lewis Namier & John Brooke, The History of Parliament: The House of Commons 1754-1790 (London: HMSO, 1964)
 J E Neale, The Elizabethan House of Commons (London: Jonathan Cape, 1949)
 Henry Stooks Smith, The Parliaments of England from 1715 to 1847, Volume 2 (London: Simpkin, Marshall & Co, 1845)  
 Heywood Townshend, Historical Collections:: or, An exact Account of the Proceedings of the Four last Parliaments of Q. Elizabeth (1680) 

 Diary of Thomas Burton, online at www.british-history.ac.uk

Parliamentary constituencies in Staffordshire (historic)
Constituencies of the Parliament of the United Kingdom established in 1290
Constituencies of the Parliament of the United Kingdom disestablished in 1832